Paz Oil Company Ltd. is the largest Israeli fuels company.  Paz distributes gasoline and other petroleum products through a network of gas stations, as well as LPG and natural gas for home use (cooking and heating) through its subsidiary PazGaz. Paz operates combined cafes and stores in many gas stations, through its subsidiary Yellow. It also owns the supermarket chains Freshmarket and Super Yuda.

History

Foundation, names, and ownership in the 20th century 
Paz was founded in 1922, as Anglo-Asiatic Petroleum. From 1927 it operated as part of Royal Dutch Shell, under the name Shell Palestine. 

In 1957 Shell decided to withdraw from Israel under economic pressure from Arab countries. In 1958, the company changed to the ownership of the Briton  Isaac Wolfson and the French Nahmias brothers and changed its name to Paz Petroleum Company Ltd. The symbol of the company, a yellow triangle, still resembles that of Shell.

Wolfson sold his company holdings in 1981 to the State of Israel, who sold it in 1988 to the Australian Jack Liberman. Since 1999, the Israeli businessman Zadik Bino owns the majority of the shares, with the Liberman family and other groups holding minority interests.

Investments and market reach in the 21st century  
In 1999, Paz acquired 74 percent of the Israeli fast food chain Burger Ranch. In late 2001, Paz completed the acquisition of Burger Ranch, becoming 100 percent owners of the chain. New branches of Burger Ranch were opened at Paz gas stations. In 2006, Paz sold the chain to the Israeli businessman Yossi Hoshinski. 

In August 2006 Paz won a tender to acquire the Ashdod Oil Refineries with a NIS 3.5 billion bid, from Oil Refineries Ltd; which was forced to break its monopoly on oil refining in Israel. The acquisition made Paz Israel's most powerful energy company and its owner Zadik Bino the industry's most powerful figure. 

In 2012, Paz held 30% of the Israeli fuel market and 31% of the Israeli gas stations. On 12 February 2020, Paz Oil was listed on the United Nations list of companies operating in West Bank settlements. On 5 July 2021, Norway's largest pension fund KLP said it would divest from Paz Oil as it helped to power Israeli settlements in the West Bank.

In March 2021, Paz acquired the Super Yuda supermarket chain for 170 million NIS. In August that year, it also acquired the Freshmarket chain.

Operations

Retail and Wholesale
 260 filling stations across Israel
 255 Yellow convenience stores 
 Pazgas - Israel’s largest gas company, supplying LPG to over half a million customers

Refining and Logistics
 Ashdod Oil Refineries

Industries and Services
 Paz Aviation 
 Paz Solar
 Paz Lubricants & Chemicals
 Pazkar – manufacturer of bituminous products, waterproofing membranes, coatings and adhesives

References

Filling stations in Israel
Oil and gas companies of Israel
Israeli brands
Companies listed on the Tel Aviv Stock Exchange
Companies based in Netanya